Isstadion is the name of several stadia or ice skating arenas in Sweden:
Malmö Isstadion
Skien Isstadion
E.ON Arena
Hovet